Raciechowice  is a village in Myślenice County, Lesser Poland Voivodeship, in southern Poland. It is the seat of the gmina (administrative district) called Gmina Raciechowice.

References

Villages in Myślenice County